Apenorto Festival (also known as Afenortoza) is an annual festival celebrated by the chiefs and people of Mepe Traditional Area in the North Tongu District of the Volta Region of Ghana. It's one of the biggest festivals in Ghana. It's usually celebrated from the month of July and throughout the month of August Afenorto means a period of staying/rest at home. It's a period where all occupational activities are brought to an end. All all citizens, both home and abroad embark on annual leave during this period. Family reunions/settlement of family disputes, Discussions pertaining to developmental projects for the following year, prayers by religious bodies to thank God for a successful year, pouring of libations, and funerals are few of the activities that characterizes the festival.The grand durbar is held on first Saturday of August.

Celebrations 
During the festival, there is a durbar of chiefs. The people wear regalia for merry making.

Significance 
The festival is a period where stocks of their lives from the previous year are taken. There is also initiation of development plans for the future. Young men also meet their future spouses during the festival.

References 

Festivals in Ghana
Volta Region